Rosser is a surname. Notable people with the surname include:

 Arthur Rosser (1864–1954), Welsh-born New Zealand builder, politician and trade unionist
 Bill Rosser (1927–2002), Aboriginal Australian author and activist who wrote about Palm Island, Queensland
 Celia Rosser (born 1930), Australian botanical illustrator
 Dois I. Rosser Jr. (1921–2019), American businessman
 Eric Franklin Rosser (born 1952), American former keyboardist and convicted child pornographer
 Hamish Rosser (born 1974), Australian drummer
 J. Allyn Rosser (born 1957), American poet
 J. Barkley Rosser (1907–1989), American logician and mathematician
 J. Barkley Rosser Jr. (born 1948), American economist, son of the above
 Joseph Rosser, American politician
 Khallifah Rosser (born 1995), American hurdler
 Mel Rosser (1901–1988), Welsh dual-code international rugby player
 Richard Rosser, Baron Rosser (born 1944), British former trade union leader and Labour politician
 Ronald E. Rosser (1929–2020), United States Army Medal of Honor recipient
 Susan Rosser, British biologist
 Tania Rosser (born 1978), New Zealand-born Irish rugby union player
 Thomas L. Rosser (1836–1910), American Civil War Confederate general and Spanish–American War United States Army brigadier general of volunteers

See also
 Martin Rossor, British clinical neurologist